Evergreen refers to plants that have leaves all year round.

Evergreen or Ever green may also refer to:

Places

Australia
 Evergreen, Queensland, a town in the Toowoomba Region

Canada
 Evergreen, Calgary, a neighbourhood
 Evergreen, Edmonton, a neighbourhood
 Evergreen, Saskatoon, a neighbourhood

United States
 Washington (state), nicknamed The Evergreen State
 Evergreen, Conecuh County, Alabama
 Evergreen, Autauga County, Alabama
 Evergreen, San Jose, California
 Evergreen Village Square, San Jose
 Evergreen, Colorado
 Evergreen, Florida
 Evergreen Park, Illinois
 Evergreen, Louisiana
 Evergreen, Baltimore, Maryland, a neighborhood
 Evergreen Township, Montcalm County, Michigan
 Evergreen Township, Sanilac County, Michigan
 Evergreen Township, Minnesota
 Evergreen, Missouri
 Evergreen, Montana
 Evergreen, Tatums Township, Columbus County, North Carolina
 Evergreen, Ransom Township, Columbus County, North Carolina
 Evergreen, Ohio
 Evergreen, Allegheny County, Pennsylvania
 Evergreen, Bradford County, Pennsylvania
 Evergreen, Memphis, Tennessee, a historic district
 Evergreen, Virginia
 Evergreen, West Virginia
 Evergreen, Langlade County, Wisconsin
 Evergreen River, a river that starts in the town
 Evergreen, Marathon County, Wisconsin
 Evergreen, Washburn County, Wisconsin

Arts, entertainment and media

Music

Performers
 Evergreen (band), an American post-punk band
 Evergreen (rapper) (b. 1984), stage name of Italian rapper Nicholas Fantini

Albums
 Evergreens (album), a 1974 album by Italian singer Mina
 Evergreen (Alison Brown album), 2008
 Evergreen (Broods album), 2014
 Evergreen (Echo & the Bunnymen album), or the album's title track
 Evergreen, Volume 2, by the Stone Poneys
 Evergreen, by Audrey Assad
 Evergreen (After the Burial album), 2019
 Evergreen (Pentatonix album), 2021

Songs
 "Evergreen" (Love Theme from A Star Is Born), movie theme of A Star is Born (1976) by Barbra Streisand
 "Evergreen", by Susan Jacks
 "Evergreen (You Didn't Deserve Me at All)", by Omar Apollo from the album Ivory.
 "Evergreen", by The Brian Jonestown Massacre from the album Methodrone
 "Evergreen", by the Fiery Furnaces from the album EP
 "Evergreen", by Hyde
 "Evergreen", by Into a Circle
 "Evergreen" (Hitomi Takahashi song), 2005
 "Evergreen" (Westlife song), originally by Westlife from the album World of Our Own, made famous by Will Young
 "Evergreen", by Jars of Clay from the album Christmas Songs
 "Evergreen", by Dark New Day from the EP Black Porch (Acoustic Sessions)
 "Evergreen", by Scale the Summit from the album The Migration
 "Evergreen", by Knuckle Puck from the album Copacetic
 "Ever Green", by Band-Maid from the album Maid in Japan

Television

Series
 Evergreen (TV series), a 2018 South Korean television series
 Evergreen (miniseries), a 1985 NBC miniseries starring Lesley Ann Warren

Episodes
 "Evergreen" (Adventure Time), an episode of the animated television series Adventure Time
 "Evergreen" (The Twilight Zone), an episode of the 2002 revival of The Twilight Zone television series

Other arts, entertainment and media
 Ever Green, a 1930 musical
 Evergreen (film), a 1934 British film based upon the 1930 musical
 Evergreen (journalism) (or "evergreen story"), an article that can be run at any time
 Evergreen (manga), a 2011 Japanese manga series
 Evergreen, the first novel by Belva Plain, later made into a miniseries
 Evergreen Game, an 1852 chess game between Adolf Anderssen and Jean Dufresne
 Evergreen Review, a literary magazine

Historic structures
 Evergreen (Hopewell, Virginia), a historic plantation house
 Evergreen (Mount Savage, Maryland), a historic museum property listed on the National Register of Historic Places (NRHP)
 Evergreen (Owensville, Maryland), a historic home listed on the NRHP
 Evergreen (Rocky Mount, Virginia), a historic home listed on the NRHP
 Evergreen Museum & Library, Baltimore, Maryland, listed on the NRHP
 Evergreen on the Falls, Baltimore, Maryland, a historic home listed on the NRHP

Organizations
 Evergreen Cooperatives, a connected group of worker-owned cooperatives in Cleveland, Ohio, US
 Evergreen Holding Group, a Chinese holding company with interests in shipbuilding and potash mining
 Evergreen International, a Latter-day Saint nonprofit corporation working to advance the ex-gay movement
 Evergreen International Aviation, a defunct aviation services company based in the Pacific Northwest, holding company of Evergreen International Airlines
 Evergreen International Airlines, a defunct cargo airline based in McMinnville, Oregon, US
 Evergreen Investments, a former subsidiary of the financial services company Wachovia 
 Evergreen Marine, a worldwide shipping company based in Taiwan
 Evergreen Group, the organizational designation used by a Taiwan-based conglomerate of shipping, transportation, and associated service companies, once part of Evergreen Marine
 Evergreen State College, a college in Olympia, Washington, US

Science and technology
 Evergreen (GPU family), a series of ATI Technologies graphics processing units
 Evergreen (software), an open source integrated library system developed by the Georgia Public Library Service
 Evergreen rose, a climbing perennial with thorny stems

Other uses
 Evergreening, attempting to extend patent protection beyond its normal expiration date through slight modification or unconventional means
 Project Evergreen, a series of infrastructure projects by Chiltern Railways
 Evergreen, a shade of green
 USCGC Evergreen (WLB-295); WAGL-295; WAGO-295; WMEC-295, a former US Coast Guard buoy tender, medium endurance cutter, and later as an oceanographic research vessel

See also
 Evergreen Cemetery (disambiguation)
 The Evergreens, a campground in Solon, Maine, US